Arctotirolites is an extinct genus of cephalopod belonging to the ammonite subclass. It was described by Popov in 1963, based on a single specimen found in the Olenyok River basin, in the Olenikites zone of northern Siberia.

References

Ceratitida genera
Xenodiscidae